Vaya Semanita is a Spanish weekly sketch comedy show that is broadcast on Basque public television's second channel Euskal Telebista (ETB 2) since 2004. It is broadcast in Spanish.

Cast

First and second seasons

Óskar Terol
Nerea Garmendia
Iñigo Agirre
Alejandro Tejería
Andoni Agirregomezkorta
Gorka Otxoa
Elisa Lledó
Julian Azkarate
Maribel Salas
Santi Ugalde
Kike Biguri

Seasons 3-5
Andoni Agirregomezkorta
Iker Galartza
Javier Antón
Itziar Lazkano
Laura de la Calle
Manuel Elizondo
Diego Pérez
Susana Soleto
Antonio Salazar
Raúl Poveda
Julián Azkarate
Carlos Urbina
Ángela Moreno
Elisa Lledó
Ramón Merlo
Gotzon Mantuliz

Season 6
Andoni Agirregomezkorta
Iker Galartza
Javier Antón
Itziar Lazkano
Manuel Elizondo
Diego Pérez
Susana Soleto
Ramon Merlo
Itziar Atienza
Pablo Salaberria

External links
Official website 

2000s Spanish comedy television series
2010s Spanish comedy television series
2003 Spanish television series debuts
2016 Spanish television series endings
EITB original programming